The Sangiric languages are a subgroup of the Austronesian languages spoken in North Sulawesi, Indonesia and several small islands to the north which belong to the Philippines. They are classified as a branch of the Philippine subgroup.

Classification
The following classification scheme is from James Sneddon (1984:57).

North Sangiric
Talaud
Sangirese (two variants: Sangir in Indonesia and Sangil in the Philippines)
South Sangiric
Bantik
Ratahan

The North Sangiric languages are spoken in the Sangir and Talaud archipelagos of Indonesia just north of Sulawesi, as well as the Sarangani Islands of the Philippines just south of Mindanao. The South Sangiric languages are spoken in scattered locations on the  northern tip of Sulawesi. Bantik is spoken in the Manado region, while Ratahan is spoken just south of Lake Tondano.

Reconstruction

Proto-Sangiric (PSan) has been reconstructed by Sneddon (1984).

Phonology 

The exact phonetic nature of *R is unclear. Its reflexes are Sangil , Sangir, Ratahan , Talaud , Bantik zero. Sneddon speculates that it may have been a coarticulated apical trill with velar friction, which is the usual realization of Sangil .

Vocabulary 
The comparison table (a small selection from ) illustrates the correspondences between the Sangiric languages, including inherited vocabulary as well as Sangiric innovations.

See also
Minahasan languages
Gorontalo–Mongondow languages
Languages of Sulawesi

References

External links
 Sangiric at Ethnologue (23rd ed., 2020).

 
Philippine languages
Languages of Sulawesi